John Raat is a former football (soccer) player who represented New Zealand at international level.

Raat played two official A-international matches for the New Zealand in 1960, both against Pacific minnows Tahiti, the first a 5–1 win on 5 September, the second a 2–1 win on 12 September 1960. He scored two of New Zealand's goals in the first game and one in the second for a total of three goals in official matches.

References 

Year of birth missing (living people)
Living people
Wellington United players
New Zealand association footballers
New Zealand international footballers
Association football forwards